The Tonkawa are a Native American tribe of Oklahoma and Texas.

Tonkawa may also refer to:

Tonkawa, Oklahoma, a city in Oklahoma
Tonkawa language, an extinct language formerly spoken by the Tonkawa people
Tonkawa (YTB-786), a U.S. Navy tugboat